Pyry  is one of the southernmost neighborhoods of the city of Warsaw. Administratively part of the Ursynów district, it was originally a separate village located along ulica Puławska (Puławy Street), which links Warsaw with the town of Piaseczno. To the east, Pyry borders on the Kabaty Woods.

Founded probably in the 14th century as a property of the Służewski family (of the Radwan coat of arms), the village retained much of its rural character until the 1990s, most of its inhabitants being farmers or workers at Warsaw factories. However, since then it has been a reserve of available space for new residential areas, mostly single-family houses for upper-middle-class Varsovians.

Before World War II, Pyry was also the seat of the Polish General Staff's Cipher Bureau, the agency that before the war was the only one in the world to break the German Enigma cipher (beginning in December 1932).

References

Further reading
Colman, John (2017) The German Spy and the Codebreakers. Chapter 14. . Kindle Books

External links

Neighbourhoods of Ursynów
Cipher Bureau (Poland)